was a Ryuka poet (1650?–1668?) who was born to a poor peasant in the village of Yomitan in the Ryukyu Kingdom.  She worked in Yoshiya, an Akasen or red-light district house, in the 17th century. She charmed many pechin by her literary ability and beautiful looks. A legend tells that she fell in love with the Aji of Nakazatu, but she committed suicide via starvation on hearing her freedom was bought by a rich man called Kurogumo, at age 18.

Historicity
No contemporary source mentions Yoshiya, probably for her humble status. Some ryuka traditionally attributed to her are probably not her own. Fuku Hiromi noted that Yoshiya means "what will be will be" in Japanese poetry, which Heshikiya was familiar with.

Kadekaru Chizuko pointed out that earlier sources did not identify the composer of poems attributed to Yoshiya today. Hokama Shuzen observed that her poems reflected waka-style artifice and thus were composed some time around the early 18th century.

Her Ryuka

At age 8, she had to cross the Hija Bridge between Kadena and Yomitan to be sold to a house.
  

Ryukyuan language
恨む比謝橋（ひじゃばし）や　情け無（ね）ぬ人の
我身（わみ）渡さと思て　架けて置（う）ちぇら
流れゆる水に　さくら花浮きて
色美（いろちゅ）らさあてど　掬くてみちゃる
寄る辺無（べね）ん物や　海士（あま）の捨て小舟
着く方ど頼む　繋ぎたぼり
たのむ夜や　更けておとずれも　無いらぬ
一人山の端の　月に向かいて

Pronunciation
Uramu Hijabashiya Nasakenenu Hitunu
Wamiwatasato Umute Kaketeuchera
Nagareyuru Mizuni Sakurabana Ukiti
Irochurasa Atedo Sukutemicharu
Yorubenen Munuya Amano Sutekobune
Tukukatado Tanumu Tugitabori
Tanumuyaya Fuketei Otozuren Nenun
Hityui Yamanufanu Tutini Nkati

Translation
I bear a grudge against Hija Bridge, a person with ill feeling
might construct it, in order for me to pass it
(She had to go to a red-light district house)
Cherry blossoms are floating on the flowing water
They are so beautiful, that I unintentionally dipped them up
There is a boat discarded by a fisherman, floating and not reaching the shore
the shore is the only safe spot. Please help me who is like the boat, without dependable persons
The promised night is passing. There is no atmosphere of his visiting me
I am alone, facing the moon rising on the edge of a mountain

References

External links
琉歌, Ryuka

1650s births
1660s deaths
17th-century Ryukyuan people